William John Fielding (1886–1973) was an American author and sexologist.

Bibliography 
 Pebbles from Parnassus comprising rhymes of revolt and flitting fancies (1917)
 Psycho-analysis : the key to human behavior (1920)
 Sanity in sex (1920)
 The caveman within us (1922)
 What every boy should know (1924)
 What every married man should know (1924)
 What every young man should know (1924)
 Teeth and mouth hygiene (1924 or 1925)
 Homo-sexual Life (1925)
 Man's sexual life (1925)
 Dual and multiple personality (1926)
 Sex and the Love Life (1927)
 Boccaccio : lover and chronicler of love (1930)
 Strange customs of courtship and marriage (1942)

References 

American writers